Valentine Plains is a rural locality in the Shire of Banana, Queensland, Australia.

History 
Valentine Plains Provisional School opened on 8 October 1928. In 1932, it became Valentine Plains State School. It closed on 21 July 1967. It was on Valentine Plains Road. 

Calvale Provisional School opened on 26 April 1940. In 1947, it became Calvale State School. It closed in December 1956. It was on Calvale Road (approx ).

Education 
There are no schools in Valentine Plains. The nearest government primary schools are Biloela State School in neighbouring Biloela to the west, Thangool State School in neighbouring Thangool in the south-west, and Mount Murchison State School in the neighbouring Mount Murchison to the north-west. The nearest government secondary school is Biloela State High School in Biloela.

Amenities 
The Valentine Plains branch of the Queensland Country Women's Association meets at the CWA Hall at 271 Valentines Plains Road.

References 

Shire of Banana
Localities in Queensland